Sisurcana pallidobrunnea is a species of moth of the  family Tortricidae. It is found in Morona-Santiago Province,  Ecuador.

The wingspan is about 28 mm. The ground colour of the forewings is cream brown with a slight rust admixture. The markings are black. The hindwings are brownish grey, in the distal part spotted with cream.

Etymology
The species name refers to the weak brownish colouration of the forewings and is derived from Latin pallidus (meaning pale) and brunnea (meaning brown).

References

Moths described in 2006
Sisurcana
Moths of South America
Taxa named by Józef Razowski